Rosenberg is a family name and toponym of German origin. Its principal meaning is "mountain of roses", from Rose + Berg. However, as a toponym, in some locations it may have originally meant "red mountain" or simply "red hill", from rot + Berg. The terminal consonant of the /rot/-/roθ/-/roð/-/ros/ syllable has varied across regions and centuries; there are many variations of the name, including Rozenberg, Rotenberg, Rottenberg, Rothenberg and Rodenberg. It is a common name among Ashkenazi Jews.

Notable people

Rosenberg

A–E
Aaron "Rosy" Rosenberg (1912–1979), two-time "All-American" college football player, and film and television producer 
Aleksandr Rosenberg (1877–1935), Russian architect
Alexander Rosenberg (born 1946), American philosopher of science
Alfred Rosenberg (1893–1946), German theorist and Nazi official, executed for war crimes
Alina Rosenberg (born 1992), German Paralympic equestrian
Allen Rosenberg (rowing) (1931–2013), American rowing coxswain and rowing coach
Andrei Rosenberg (1739–1813), Russian military officer
 Ari Rosenberg (born 1964), Israeli basketball player
Ariel Marcus Rosenberg (born 1978), American singer-songwriter and musician
Arthur Rosenberg (1889–1943), German Marxist historian and writer
Tony Randall (born Aryeh Leonard Rosenberg, 1920-2004), American actor
Barnett Rosenberg (1926–2009), American chemist who discovered anti-tumor properties of cisplatin
Caroline Rosenberg (1810-1902), Danish botanist
Chris Rosenberg (1950–1979), American mobster
 Clarke Rosenberg (born 1993), American-Israeli basketball player
Debbie Rosenberg (born 1969), American bridge player
Elias Abraham Rosenberg (c.1810–1887), early visitor to Hawaii and friend of King David Kalakaua
Elmer Rosenberg (1885–1951), American politician
Emil Rosenberg (1842–1925), Baltic German chemist
Evelyn Rosenberg, American sculptor

F–M
Franz Seraph of Orsini-Rosenberg (1761–1832), Austrian general of the Napoleonic Wars
Fishel Rosenberg, birth name of Fred Rose (politician) (1907–1983), Canadian politician and trade unionist convicted of spying for the Soviet Union
Göran Rosenberg (born 1948), Swedish journalist and author
Hans Rosenberg (1904–1988), German historian
Hans Oswald Rosenberg (1879–1940), German astronomer
Harold Rosenberg (1906–1978), American art critic, creator of the term "action painting"
Hermann von Rosenberg (1817–1888), German naturalist
Hilding Rosenberg (1892–1985), Swedish composer
Isaac Rosenberg (1890–1918), English poet and artist
Janet Rosenberg, birth name of Janet Jagan (1920–2009), President of Guyana
Jerry Rosenberg (1937–2009), American jailhouse lawyer
Joel Rosenberg (disambiguation), several people
Jonathan Rosenberg (mathematician) (born 1951), American mathematician
Jonathan Rosenberg (artist) (born 1973), American webcomic artist
Julius and Ethel Rosenberg (1918–1953 and 1915–1953), Americans who spied for the Soviet Union, executed for espionage
Justus Rosenberg (1921–2021), Polish-born American educator and member of the Resistance during World War II
Kenny Rosenberg (born 1995), American baseball player
Kirsten Rosenberg, American singer for The Iron Maidens
Lars Rosenberg (born 1971), Swedish heavy metal musician
Leo Rosenberg (1879–1963), German jurist 
Lina Olsson Rosenberg (born 1971), Swedish handball player
Louis Conrad Rosenberg (1890–1983), American etcher
Mark Rosenberg (disambiguation), several people
Margarete Rosenberg (1910–1985), German Holocaust survivor
Margarete Rosenberg (1894–1993), German Expressionist poet better known under the pseudonym Henriette Hardenberg
Marianne Rosenberg (born 1955), German singer and songwriter
Markus Rosenberg (born 1982), Swedish footballer
Marlene Rosenberg, American plasma physicist
Marshall Rosenberg (1934–2015), American psychologist and the creator of Nonviolent Communication
Matthew Rosenberg (born 1974), American journalist 
Mauritz Rosenberg (1879–1941), Finnish politician
Michael Rosenberg (born 1954), American bridge player
 Michael David Rosenberg (born 1984), British pop singer better known as Passenger
Milton J. Rosenberg, University of Chicago social psychology professor and radio host

N–Z
Nikolay Yakovlevich Rosenberg (1807–1857), Russian naval officer
Noah Rosenberg, geneticist at the University of Michigan
Otto Rosenberg, Russian sinologist
Pablo Rosenberg, Argentine singer
Paul Rosenberg (disambiguation), several people
Peter Rosenberg, American radio DJ and television show host
Richie Rosenberg, American trombonist and talk show personality
Robert Rosenberg (disambiguation), several people
Rodrigo Rosenberg Marzano, Guatemalan lawyer
Rose Rosenberg (1892–1966), British private secretary
 Samuel Rosenberg (writer) (1912–1996), American writer and photographer
 Samuel I. Rosenberg (born 1950), American politician in the Maryland House of Delegates
 Samuel Rosenberg (artist) (1896–1972), American artist and professor
Sándor Rosenberg (1844–1909), progressive Hungarian rabbi
Scott Rosenberg, American screenwriter
Scott Rosenberg (journalist), American journalist
Scott Mitchell Rosenberg, American film producer
Stan Rosenberg (born 1949), American politician
Stochelo Rosenberg, Dutch Sinti-Gypsy jazz guitarist
Stuart Rosenberg, American film director
Steven Rosenberg, American surgeon and cancer immunotherapy pioneer
Susanne Rosenberg (born 1957), Swedish folk music singer and vocal coach
Tiina Rosenberg (born 1958), Swedish professor
Tiit Rosenberg, Estonian historian
Vanna Rosenberg (born 1973), Swedish singer and actress
Vjekoslav Rosenberg-Ružić, Croatian composer, conductor and music educator
William Rosenberg (1916–2002), American founder of Dunkin' Donuts
William of Rosenberg (1535–1592), Bohemian nobleman
William Frederick Henry Rosenberg (1868–1957), English zoologist
Yehudah Yudel Rosenberg (1860-1935),  Rabbi, author, and Jewish communal leader
Zoe Rosenberg, American animal rights activist and animal sanctuary founder

Rozenberg 
David I. Rozenberg (1879–1950), Lithuanian/Soviet economist
Grzegorz Rozenberg (born 1942), Polish-born mathematician and computer scientist
Joshua Rozenberg (born 1950), British journalist specializing in legal matters
Dadara (born 1969), Polish-Dutch artist, birth name Daniel Rozenberg

Fictional characters
Willow Rosenberg, character in American television series Buffy the Vampire Slayer
Ken Rosenberg, a character in the Grand Theft Auto video games

Other
Rosenberg family, Bohemian Rosenberg dynasty, Lords of Krumlov and Rožmberk
Orsini-Rosenberg, Austrian princely family

See also 
 Rodenberg (disambiguation)
 Rosenegg (disambiguation)
 Rotenberg
 Rottenberg
 Rotenburg (disambiguation)
 Rothenberg (surname)
 Rottenburg (disambiguation)

German-language surnames
Jewish surnames
Toponymic surnames
Yiddish-language surnames
Swedish-language surnames
Danish-language surnames

he:רוזנברג